Tepeji (officially: Tepeji del Río de Ocampo) is one of the 84 municipalities of Hidalgo, in central-eastern Mexico. The municipality covers an area of 393.4 km². The town is known for its valley landscape, with natural attractions such as Lake Requena, a vast lake surrounded by tall hills. 

Tepeji del Rio has many industrial complexes with companies such as  Beaver Manufacturing ,Procter and Gamble, Kaltex, Arteche, Zaga, PPG, Pilgrims Pride etc. Amanali Country Club & Nautica has a golf course situated in the northern part of the town overlooking Lake Requena, along with associated residential areas. Plaza del Rio, Tepeji's main plaza, has most of the town's commercial outlets, including a Soriana, a Pemex gas station, a Cinepolis movie theater, a Domino's Pizza, and other outlets.

The 2010 census reported that the municipality had a total population of 80,612, though the welcome road sign at the south entrance of Tepeji states a population of 100,000. In contrast to the rapid urbanization of central Mexico, Tepeji sits just outside the Mexico City Metropolitan area. The town is also known for being the birthplace of Mexican footballer Raúl Jiménez.

As of 2020, Tepeji is governed by Salvador Jiménez Calzadilla, member of the Institutional Revolutionary Party.

Demography

Populated places in Tepeji

References

Municipalities of Hidalgo (state)
Populated places in Hidalgo (state)
Populated places in the Teotlalpan
Otomi settlements